Étincelles, Op. 36 No. 6 (Sparks) is a piece for solo piano by Moritz Moszkowski. It is the sixth piece from Moszkowski's 8 Characteristic Pieces set.

Analysis
This flashy showpiece, as the name suggests, conveys images of flashing sparks through the use of a staccato theme and extremely fast scale passages, which require a great deal of technical ability. The piece is written in the key of B-flat major and in 3/8 time. A happy and lively mood is consistent throughout the piece although the dynamics are nearly always quiet.

Étincelles has a duration of about three minutes.

Performances

Étincelles is a popular piece and many famous pianists have recorded it. In particular the pianist Vladimir Horowitz played the piece frequently as an encore at many of his later concerts. He also composed his own coda to the piece.

See also
List of compositions by Moritz Moszkowski

References

External links
Score at the IMSLP
Score of Vladimir Horowitz Edition
Étincelles, Op. 36, No. 6 performed by Vladimir Horowitz (YouTube)

Compositions by Moritz Moszkowski
Compositions for solo piano
Piano compositions in the Romantic era